| player              = 
| prevseason          = Clausura 2018
| nextseason          = Clausura 2019
}}

The Apertura 2018 Copa MX was the 80th staging of the Copa MX, the 52nd staging in the professional era and is the thirteenth tournament played since the 1996–97 edition.

The tournament started on 24 July 2018 and ended on 31 October 2018.

The final was held at  Estadio BBVA Bancomer in the Monterrey suburb of Guadalupe with the visiting team Cruz Azul defeating Monterrey 2–0 to win their fourth title.

As winners, Cruz Azul earned a spot to face the winners of the Clausura 2019 edition, in the 2019 Supercopa MX.

Participants
The tournament will feature all Liga MX clubs (excluding Lobos BUAP) as well as the first ten Ascenso MX clubs of the 2017–18 Ascenso MX aggregate table.

Due to the new format of the CONCACAF Champions League, Mexican clubs do not begin their participation until February, thus the teams qualified to 2018–19 CONCACAF Champions League (Monterrey, Santos Laguna, Toluca, UANL) will participate in this season's Copa MX.

Teams
The following 27 teams qualified for the tournament.

In the following table, the number of appearances, last appearance, and previous best result count only those in the Copa MX era starting from Apertura 2012 (not counting those in the eras from 1907 to 1996).

Draw
The draw for the tournament took place on 5 June 2018 at the Iberostar Hotel in Cancún, Mexico.27 teams were drawn into nine groups of three with each group, except group 9, containing two teams from Liga MX and one team from Ascenso MX.

Clubs in Pot 1 were drawn to be the seed of each group according to the order of their drawing. That is, the first club that was drawn is seed of Group 1, the second drawn is seed of Group 2 and so on and so on. The Liga MX teams in Pot 1 are teams who ended 1–4 in the 2017–18 Liga MX Aggregate table. The champions of the last two editions, Monterrey (who is also first in Aggregate table) and Necaxa are also in Pot 1. The Ascenso MX teams in Pot 1 are teams who ended 1–4 in the 2017–18 Ascenso MX Aggregate table.

Pot 2 contained Liga MX clubs who ended 5–8 in the Aggregate table and Ascenso MX clubs who ended 5–9 in the Aggregate table.

Pot 3 contained Liga MX clubs who ended 10–18 (excluding Lobos BUAP) in the Aggregate table. Atlético San Luis, who ended tenth in the Ascenso MX Aggregate table, is the lone Ascenso MX club in Pot 3.

Tiebreakers
If two or more clubs are equal on points on completion of the group matches, the following criteria are applied to determine the rankings:

 scores of the group matches played among the clubs in question;
 superior goal difference;
 higher number of goals scored;
 higher number of goals scored away in the group matches played among the clubs in question;
 fair play ranking;
 drawing of lots.

Group stage
Every group is composed of three clubs, each group has at least one club from Liga MX and Ascenso MX.

All match times listed are CDT (UTC–6), except for matches in Culiacán, Ciudad Juárez (both UTC–7) and Tijuana (UTC–8).

Group 1

Group 2

Group 3

Group 4

Group 5

Group 6

Group 7

Group 8

Group 9

Ranking of second-placed teams

Knockout stage
The clubs that advance to this stage will be ranked and seeded 1 to 16 based on performance in the group stage. In case of ties, the same tiebreakers used to rank the runners-up will be used.
All rounds are played in a single game. If a game ends in a draw, it will proceed directly to a penalty shoot-out. The highest seeded club will host each match, regardless of which division each club belongs. 
The winners of the groups and the seven best second place teams of each group will advance to the Knockout stage.

Qualified teams
The nine group winners and the seven best runners-up from the group stage qualify for the final stage.

Seeding

Bracket

Round of 16
All match times listed are CDT (UTC–6), except for matches in Tijuana (UTC–8).

Quarterfinals

Semifinals

Final

Top goalscorers
Players sorted first by goals scored, then by last name.

Source: Copa MX

Notes

References

External links
Official site

2018, 2
2018, 2
Copa Mx, 2
Copa Mx, 2